Reminds Me of You may refer to:

 "Reminds Me of You", a 2011 song by LMFAO from the album Sorry for Party Rocking
 "Reminds me of You", a 1999 song by Van Morrison from the album Back on Top
 "Reminds Me of You" (Juice Wrld and the Kid Laroi song), 2020

See also
 "Reminds Me", a 2020 song by Kim Petras